Frank William Sharp (26 April 1899 – 15 March 1963) was an English professional footballer who played in the Football League for Birmingham and Chesterfield. He played as an inside forward.

Sharp was born in Tintwistle, which was then part of Cheshire. He worked in a steelworks and played football part-time for Barton BSC and for Mossley before turning professional with Birmingham in 1922. He made his debut in the First Division on 6 September 1922, deputising for Jackie Whitehouse in an away game against Newcastle United which finished goalless. He kept his place until Whitehouse regained fitness, but did not play again; a creative player, he was uncomfortable with a more attacking role. He moved on to Chesterfield of the Third Division North in 1923, for whom he scored seven goals in 22 league appearances. He then returned to non-league football with Stourbridge, Stalybridge Celtic, and a second spell with Mossley; over his Mossley career he scored 28 goals in 60 appearances.

Notes

References

1899 births
1963 deaths
English footballers
Association football forwards
Mossley A.F.C. players
Birmingham City F.C. players
Chesterfield F.C. players
Stourbridge F.C. players
Stalybridge Celtic F.C. players
English Football League players